The 2022 Summit League men's basketball tournament was the postseason men's basketball tournament for the Summit League for the 2021–22 season. All tournament games were played at the Denny Sanford Premier Center in Sioux Falls, South Dakota, during March 5–8, 2022.

Top-seeded South Dakota State defeated second-seeded North Dakota State, 75–69, to claim their first title in four years as well as the conference's automatic bid to the NCAA tournament.

Seeds
The top eight teams by conference record in the Summit League will compete in the conference tournament. St. Thomas was not eligible, due to its transition from Division III. Teams are seeded by record within the conference, with a tiebreaker system to seed teams with identical conference records. The tiebreakers operate in the following order:
 Head-to-head record.
 Record against the top-seeded team not involved in the tie, going down through the standings until the tie is broken.

Schedule and results

Bracket

All-Tournament Team
The following players were named to the All-Tournament Team:

References

Tournament
Summit League men's basketball tournament
Basketball competitions in Sioux Falls, South Dakota
College basketball tournaments in South Dakota
Summit League men's basketball tournament
Summit League men's basketball tournament